Harold Ross Barker (12 April 1886 – 29 August 1937) was an English rower who competed in the 1908 Summer Olympics for Great Britain.

Barker was born at Marylebone, London. He was educated at Christ Church, Oxford and was a member of the Oxford crew in the Boat Race in 1908. He also won the Silver Goblets at Henley Royal Regatta in 1908, partnering Albert Gladstone to beat Julius Beresford and Karl Vernon.  He was then a member of  the Leander coxless four with Philip Filleul, John Fenning and Gordon Thomson which won a silver medal for Great Britain rowing at the 1908 Summer Olympics and which lost to the Magdalen College, Oxford crew. Barker rowed again in the Oxford crew in the Boat Race in 1909.

Barker died at Henley-on-Thames at the age of 51.

Barker married Ellen Powell in 1909. She was the sister of fellow rowers Ronald Powell and Eric Powell.

See also
List of Oxford University Boat Race crews

References

External links
profile

1886 births
1937 deaths
Alumni of Christ Church, Oxford
English male rowers
English Olympic medallists
British male rowers
Olympic rowers of Great Britain
Rowers at the 1908 Summer Olympics
Olympic silver medallists for Great Britain
Oxford University Boat Club rowers
Olympic medalists in rowing
Medalists at the 1908 Summer Olympics